Arkalon is a ghost town in Seward County, Kansas, United States.  It was located northeast of Liberal on the west side of the Cimarron River.

History
After the Chicago, Kansas and Nebraska Railway built through the area in 1888, a townsite
sprang up and platted in 1888.  The town was named Arkalon for Arkalon Tenney, the father of the first
postmaster of the town, Hosea Eugene Tenney.  A post office called Arkalon was established in 1888 and remained in operation until 1929.

The Arkalon News newspaper was published from April 1888 until December 1892.  In 1891, a one-room school house was opened for children.  A large stockyard was erected for shipping cattle to market.  While the nearby river held promise for the early settlers, they soon found that the bottom land next the Cimarron River was too sandy for farming and flooded too often.  By the 1920s most of the early settlers had left, leaving only the railroad and stockyards behind.

References

Further reading

External links
Historical photos
 Custer Store between 1890 and 1910, Kansas Historical Society
 Arkalon Schoolhouse between 1910 and 1930

Historical railroad trestle - "Samson of the Cimarron"
 Samson of the Cimarron and Arkalon history, rits.org
 Samson of the Cimarron, kansastravel.org
 Mighty Samson Bridge nears 73rd birthday, leaderandtimes.com

Maps
 Seward County maps: Current, Historic, KDOT

Landforms of Seward County, Kansas
Ghost towns in Kansas